A cherry picker is a platform for lifting someone to work at a high level.

Cherry picker may also refer to:
 An engine crane, a cantilevered tool for installing or removing the engine block from a vehicle
 Glenbuck Cherrypickers F.C., a former Scottish football club
 The Cherry Picker, a 1974 British drama film
 One who engages in suppressing evidence (cherry picking)
 Cherry picker, in sports, a player who remains near the opponents' goal
 Nickname of the 11th Hussars of the British Army
 Literally, a person picking cherries off a cherry tree
 The platform on firefighting ladders

See also
 Cherry picking (disambiguation)